Vittorio Roberto (born 24 June 1997) is a Sri Lankan cricketer. He made his Twenty20 debut for Kandy Customs Cricket Club in the 2018–19 SLC Twenty20 Tournament on 16 February 2019. He made his List A debut for Kandy Customs Cricket Club in the 2018–19 Premier Limited Overs Tournament on 10 March 2019.

References

External links
 

1997 births
Living people
Sri Lankan cricketers
Kandy Customs Sports Club cricketers
Place of birth missing (living people)